Roselle may refer to:

 Roselle (plant), a species of hibiscus (Hibiscus sabdariffa)
A drink made from that plant, also called "Hibiscus tea"

Roselle is the/a name of:
 People
 Mike Roselle - American environmental activist and author

 Places and jurisdictions
 Roselle, Italy in Grosseto province, site of the Etruscan town of Rusellae, a former Roman & medieval bishopric and present Latin Catholic titular see
 Roselle, Illinois, a suburb of Chicago
Roselle (Metra), a railroad station in the suburb
 Roselle, Missouri, an unincorporated community
 Roselle, New Jersey, a borough
 Roselle Park, New Jersey, a borough
Roselle Park (NJT station)
 Roselle Township, Carroll County, Iowa

 Ships 
 USS Roselle (AM-379), minesweeper launched 1944, sold to Mexico 1973
 USS Roselle (SP-350), a ship that served both as a tug and as minesweeper, in the early 20th century

 In education 
Roselle Catholic High School, Roselle, New Jersey
Roselle Park High School, Roselle Park, New Jersey
Roselle Public Schools, Roselle, a school district
Roselle Park School District, Roselle Park

See also 
 Rusellae
 Rosealia
 Rosette (disambiguation)
 Rosella (disambiguation)
 Rozelle (disambiguation)